Louis Paul Dessar (January 22, 1867 – February 14, 1952) was an American painter. He painted the portraits of New York City's high society as well as Connecticut's farmers.

Life
Dessar was born on January 22, 1867, in Indianapolis, Indiana. He grew up in New York City, and he graduated from City College of New York in 1881, followed by the National Academy of Design in 1886. He also studied in Paris, France, where he attended the Académie Julian and the École des Beaux-Arts.

Dessar began his career by painting the portraits of New York City's high society. He later moved to Connecticut, where he joined the Old Lyme art colony in 1902. Influenced by the Barbizon school, he began painting Connecticut's farmers at work. His work was exhibited at the Salon, where he won a silver medal in 1891, as well as the Metropolitan Museum of Art in New York City. The National Academy of Design awarded him the 1899 Second Hallgarten Prize for Portrait of Mrs. Ruthrauff, and the 1900 First Hallgarten Prize for Landscape with Sheep.

Dessar died on February 14, 1952, in Preston, Connecticut, at the age of 85.

References

1867 births
1952 deaths
People from Indianapolis
City College of New York alumni
National Academy of Design alumni
Académie Julian alumni
American alumni of the École des Beaux-Arts
American portrait painters
American male painters
20th-century American painters
20th-century American male artists